Jonathan Court (born 30 March 1996) is a Scottish professional footballer who last played as a striker for Linlithgow Rose.

Early and personal life
Court attended Stewart's Melville College in Edinburgh, where he played rugby rather than football.

Career
Court began his senior career with Raith Rovers in 2014, spending loan spells at Newtongrange Star, Bonnyrigg Rose Athletic, East Stirlingshire and Montrose.

He scored the 5000th goal in the SPFL era for East Stirlingshire against Elgin City at Ochilview in October 2015.

He was released by Raith in May 2018, and signed for East Fife in June 2018.

Court played for Edinburgh City during the 2019–20 season and later signed with East of Scotland team Linlithgow Rose on 25 August 2020.

Rose announced that Court left the club on 2 November 2020.

Career statistics

References

1996 births
Living people
Scottish footballers
Raith Rovers F.C. players
Newtongrange Star F.C. players
Bonnyrigg Rose Athletic F.C. players
East Stirlingshire F.C. players
Montrose F.C. players
East Fife F.C. players
Scottish Professional Football League players
Association football forwards
F.C. Edinburgh players
Linlithgow Rose F.C. players